Gaines House or Gaines Farm may refer to:

in the United States
(by state then city/town)
Ralph Gaines House, Elberton, Georgia, listed on the National Register of Historic Places (NRHP) in Elbert County
Benjamin R. Gaines Farm, Burlington, Kentucky, listed on the NRHP in Boone County
James Gaines House, Georgetown, Kentucky, listed on the NRHP in Scott County
Wingate-Gaines Farm District, Petersburg, Kentucky, listed on the NRHP in Boone County
Col. Abner Gaines House, Walton, Kentucky, listed on the NRHP in Boone County
McGavock-Gaines House, Franklin, Tennessee, NRHP-listed
Craig-Beasley House, also known as Gaines House, listed on the NRHP in Williamson County